Tricca is a city of ancient Thessaly, Greece.

Tricca may also refer to:
Angiolo Tricca (1817-1884), Italian caricaturist and painter 
Fosco Tricca (1856-1918), Italian painter
Michele Tricca (born 1993), Italian sprinter

Tricca, a synonym for a genus of wolf spiders.